Kolbeinn Hermann Pálsson (born 26 November 1945) is an Icelandic former basketball player and a former member of the Icelandic national team. In 1966 he became the first basketball player to be named the Icelandic Sportsperson of the Year. He served as the chairman of the Icelandic Basketball Association from 1988 to 1996.

Early life
Kolbeinn started playing basketball at the age of 14. During his youth he was an avid Handball player and played with KR in the Icelandic top-tier handball league during the 1962–1963 before focusing fully on basketball.

Playing career
Kolbeinn spent his entire career with KR, playing a total of 383 games for the club. He last played during the 1980-1981 season, appearing in 4 games. On 18 November 1966 he scored 25 points against defending champions Simmenthal Milano in the FIBA European Champions Cup (now called EuroLeague).

On 1 December 1977 Kolbeinn ruptured his left achilles tendon in a game against Valur. He managed to return before the end of the season and participated in the extra game between KR and Njarðvík where KR won the national championship.

National team
Kolbeinn played 55 games for the Icelandic national team from 1966 to 1976. He played his first game in 1966 against Poland. In 1966 he made two free throws in the final seconds of Iceland's game against Denmark, giving them victory and the bronze in the 1966 Nordic Championships.

Awards, titles and accomplishments

Individual awards
Icelandic Sportsperson of the Year: 1966

Titles

Icelandic champion (7): 1965, 1966, 1967, 1968, 1974, 1978, 1979
Icelandic Basketball Cup (7): 1970, 1971, 1972, 1973, 1974, 1977, 1979

Personal life
Kolbeinn is the father of former Icelandic national team player Páll Kolbeinsson. His sister, Vigdís Pálsdóttir, played handball for Valur.

References

External links
Icelandic statistics 1978-1981 at kki.is

1945 births
Living people
Kolbeinn Palsson
Kolbeinn Palsson
Kolbeinn Palsson
Kolbeinn Palsson